Katharina Willkomm ( Kloke; born 19 February 1987) is a German lawyer and politician of the Free Democratic Party (FDP) who served as a member of the Bundestag from the state of North Rhine-Westphalia from 2017 to 2021.

Early life and education 
Willkomm was born in Düsseldorf, North Rhine-Westphalia. After graduating from high school, she studied law at the University of Bonn, which she completed with the first state examination. After the subsequent legal clerkship at the Aachen Regional Court, she passed the second state examination in 2017. Since then she has been working as a lawyer in a law firm in Stolberg.

Political career 
Willkomm became a member of the Bundestag in the 2017 German federal election, representing the Düren district. Since January 2018, she has been a member of the parliament's Committee on Legal Affairs and Consumer Protection and of the Electoral Review Committee. She also serves as her parliamentary group's spokeswoman for consumer protection.

References

External links 

  
 Bundestag biography 
 

 

 

1987 births
Living people
Politicians from Düsseldorf
Members of the Bundestag for North Rhine-Westphalia
Female members of the Bundestag
21st-century German women politicians
Members of the Bundestag 2017–2021
Members of the Bundestag for the Free Democratic Party (Germany)